Saanane Island National Park is a Tanzanian national park in Mwanza. The park is located on an island in Lake Victoria and can be reached by boat from the TANAPA offices on Capri Point in Mwanza town. It is named after the local farmer and fisherman Mzee Saanane Chavandi.

History 
The park, at the time known as "Saa Nane Island Game Sanctuary", was accidentally bombed during the air campaign of the Uganda–Tanzania War of 1978–1979. On 29 March 1979, Libyan leader Muammar Gaddafi ordered one of his Tupolev Tu-22 bombers to attack Mwanza, hoping to thereby intimidate the Tanzanian government into calling off its invasion of Uganda. The Tu-22 completely missed the city, however, and its five anti-personnel rockets instead hit the game sanctuary, slightly injuring one worker and killing several animals. According to journalists Tony Avirgan and Martha Honey, six antelopes as well as many birds were killed. In contrast, intelligence analyst Kenneth M. Pollack stated that "a large number of antelope" was killed.

Fauna 
The island is home to various species of mammals, including the velvet monkey, wild cat, zebra and rock hyrax, amongst others. It is the only place in Tanzania where De-brazza's monkeys are found. Over 40 species of bird have also been recorded here.

See also
Rubondo Island National Park

References

Works cited 

 
 
 

National parks of Tanzania
2013 establishments in Tanzania
Geography of Mwanza Region
Protected areas established in 2013
Tourist attractions in the Mwanza Region